Gabriel Francini (born December 12, 1969 in La Plata, Argentina) is a male former tennis player from San Marino.

Francini represented his native country in the doubles competition at the 1992 Summer Olympics in Barcelona, Spain, partnering Christian Forcellini. The pair was eliminated in the first round there.

Francini played in 25 Davis Cup ties for San Marino from 1993 to 2000, posting a 3–5 record in singles and a 3–15 record in doubles.

References
 
 
 
 

1969 births
Living people
Tennis players at the 1992 Summer Olympics
Olympic tennis players of San Marino
Sammarinese male tennis players
Argentine male tennis players
Sammarinese people of Argentine descent
Sportspeople of Argentine descent
Sportspeople from La Plata